Xiasha station may refer to:

 Xiasha station (Shanghai Metro), a metro station in Shanghai, China
 Xiasha station (Shenzhen Metro), a metro station in Shenzhen, China

See also 
 West Xiasha station, a metro station in Hangzhou, China
 Xiasha Jiangbin station, another metro station in Hangzhou, China